Joseph Bell (1837–1911) was Scottish lecturer and inspiration for the literary character Sherlock Holmes.

Joseph or Joe Bell may also refer to:

Politics and law
 Joseph Bell (Mississippi politician) (c. 1811–1885), American politician; secretary of state of Mississippi
 Joseph M. Bell (died 1851), Massachusetts lawyer, abolitionist, and politician
 Joseph Nicholas Bell (1864–1922), British Labour politician and Justice of the Peace

Sports
 Joseph Bell (rugby union) (1899–1963), New Zealand rugby union player
 Joe Bell (ice hockey) (1923–2014), Canadian ice hockey player
 Joe Bell (baseball) (fl. 1932), American baseball player
 Joseph-Antoine Bell (born 1954), Cameroonian football goalkeeper
 Joe Bell (American football) (born 1956), American football player
 Joe Bell (footballer) (born 1999), New Zealand footballer

Others
 Joseph Bell (engineer) (1861–1912), British chief engineer of RMS Titanic
 Joe Bell (1964–2013), American anti-bullying crusader; father of Jadin Bell

Other uses
 Joe Bell (film), 2020 film about the American anti-bullying crusader
 Joe Bell site, American archaeological site in Morgan County, Georgia